Mary Morris Vaux Walcott (July 31, 1860 – August 22, 1940) was an American artist and naturalist known for her watercolor paintings of wildflowers. She has been called the "Audubon of Botany."

Life

Vaux was born in Philadelphia, Pennsylvania, to a wealthy Quaker family. After graduating from the Friends Select School in Philadelphia in 1879, she took an interest in watercolor painting. When she was not working on the family farm, she began painting illustrations of wildflowers that she saw on family trips to the Rocky Mountains in Canada. During these summer trips, she and her brothers studied mineralogy and recorded the flow of glaciers in drawings and photographs. The trips to the Canadian Rockies sparked her interest in geology.

In 1880, her mother died and at 19 years old Vaux took on the responsibility of caring for her father and two younger brothers. After 1887, she and her brothers went back to western Canada almost every summer. During this time she became an active mountain climber, outdoors woman, and photographer. Asked one summer to paint a rare blooming arnica by a botanist, she was encouraged to concentrate on botanical illustration. She spent many years exploring the rugged terrain of the Canadian Rockies to find important flowering species to paint. On these trips, Vaux became the first woman to accomplish the over 10,000 feet ascent of Mount Stephen. In 1887, on her first transcontinental trip via rail, she wrote an engaging travel journal of the family's four-month trek through the American West and the Canadian Rockies.

Over her father's fierce objections, in 1914 Mary Vaux, then 54, married the paleontologist Charles Doolittle Walcott, a widower who was the Secretary of the Smithsonian Institution. She played an active part in her husband's projects, returning to the Rockies with him several times and continuing to paint wildflowers. In 1925, the Smithsonian published some 400 of her illustrations, accompanied by brief descriptions, in a five-volume work entitled North American Wild Flowers, the proceeds of which went to the Smithsonian's endowment. In Washington, Vaux became a close friend of First Lady Lou Henry Hoover and raised money to erect the Florida Avenue Meeting House, so that the first Quaker President and his wife would have a proper place to worship. From 1927 to 1932, Mary Vaux Walcott served on the federal Board of Indian Commissioners and, driven by her chauffeur, traveled extensively throughout the American West, diligently visiting reservations.

When she was 75, she made her first trip abroad to Japan to visit lifelong friend and fellow Philadelphia Quaker, Mary Elkinton Nitobe, who had married Japanese diplomat Inazo Nitobe.

She was elected president of the Society of Woman Geographers in 1933. In 1935, the Smithsonian published Illustrations of North American Pitcher-Plants, which included 15 paintings by Walcott. Following the death of her husband in 1927, Walcott established the Charles Doolittle Walcott Medal in his honor. It is awarded for scientific work on pre-Cambrian and Cambrian life and history. Walcott died in St. Andrews, New Brunswick in 1940.

In her own words
On field photography:

"A camera is a very delightful adjunct, for it is pleasant to have some tangible results to show, on your return home. A Kodak, if no larger instrument can be managed, yields most satisfactory results, although the better records from a larger-sized camera are an increased delight, when one has the patience and skill to obtain them. For changing plates in camp, an improvised tepee can be made of the blankets, and, if this is done after sundown, is quite satisfactory." - Vaux, writing in "Camping in the Canadian Rockies" in the Canadian Alpine Journal

On measuring glaciers:

""The glaciers must be measured, and I shall hope to use the camera seriously, and get all I can. Last summer's work was such a disappointment in photographic results." -Mary Vaux Walcott, Letters to Charles Walcott, April 1, 1912.

On the outdoors:

"Sometimes I feel that I can hardly wait till the time comes to escape from city life, to the free air of the everlasting hills."  -Mary Vaux Walcott, Letters to Charles Walcott, Feb 19, 1912.

Legacy
Upon her death in 1940, Mary Vaux Walcott bequeathed $400,000 to the Smithsonian Institution as an addition to the fund she and her husband, Charles Walcott, created for geological research and publication.

A mountain, called Mount Mary Vaux, in Jasper National Park, Alberta, Canada, is named after her. Mary Vaux shared interests similar to those of artist, photographer, writer and explorer Mary Schäffer, and they were good friends.

Selected works

North American Wildflowers, 5 vols., pub. by the Smithsonian Institution, 1925, repub. 1988 
15 paintings in Illustrations of American Pitcherplants, pub. by the Smithsonian Institution, 1935

Notes

References

External links
 
Picture Journal including photographs of and by Mary Vaux
Encyclopædia Britannica entry for Mary Morris Vaux Walcott
Mount Mary Vaux
Images of paintings from the Southwest School of Botanical Medicine
Public profile of Mary Vaux Walcott at Bionomia, linking to specimens she identified or collected, and work she enabled

1860 births
1940 deaths
American naturalists
American women painters
Flower artists
Masterpiece Museum
American women botanists
American Quakers
19th-century American botanists
20th-century American botanists
19th-century American painters
20th-century American painters
19th-century American women artists
20th-century American women artists
Members of the Society of Woman Geographers
20th-century American women scientists